The 1945 Arizona Wildcats football team represented the University of Arizona as an independent during the 1945 college football season.  In their fifth season under head coach Mike Casteel, and after two years without a football program during World War II, the Wildcats compiled a perfect 5–0 record, shut out three of five opponents, and outscored all opponents, 193 to 12. The team captain was Boyd Morse.  The team played its home games at Arizona Stadium in Tucson, Arizona.

Schedule

References

Arizona
Arizona Wildcats football seasons
College football undefeated seasons
Arizona Wildcats football